Diamond Lake is an unincorporated community in Lake County, Illinois, United States. Diamond Lake is located along Illinois Route 60 and Illinois Route 83, north of Long Grove and south of Mundelein.

References

Unincorporated communities in Illinois
Chicago metropolitan area
Unincorporated communities in Lake County, Illinois